Killeen Air Force Station (ADC ID: TM-192) is a closed United States Air Force General Surveillance Radar station. It was closed in 1961.

History
Killeen Air Force Station came into existence as part of Phase III of the Air Defense Command (ADC) Mobile Radar program. On October 20, 1953, ADC requested a third phase of twenty-five radar sites be constructed.   It was constructed on the existing Robert Gray AFB to provide radar protection for the Fort Hood area.

The 814th Aircraft Control and Warning Squadron was moved to Killeen AFS on 14 February 1957.  It operated AN/FPS-20 search radar and an AN/FPS-6 height-finder radars at the station, and initially the station functioned as a Ground-Control Intercept (GCI) and warning station.  As a GCI station, the squadron's role was to guide interceptor aircraft toward unidentified intruders picked up on the unit's radar scopes.

In addition to the main facility, Killeen operated two AN/FPS-18 Gap Filler sites between April and December 1960:
 Schulenburg, Texas    (TM-192B): 
 Normangee, Texas      (TM-192C): 

Killeen was inactivated 1 February 1961 due to budgetary cuts.  Today most of the site is unused, but maintained by Fort Hood with most of the buildings being torn down.  A radio tower is now on the site. The circular concrete foundation for the AN/FPS-20A search radar tower is clearly visible in aerial imagery.

Air Force units and assignments

Units
 Constituted as the 814th Aircraft Control and Warning Squadron
 Activated on 8 May 1956 at Oklahoma City AFS, OK (not manned or equipped)
 Moved to Killeen AFS on 14 February 1957
 Discontinued and inactivated on 1 February 1961

Assignments
 33d Air Division, 14 February 1957
 Oklahoma City Air Defense Sector, 1 January 1960 - 1 February 1961

See also
 List of USAF Aerospace Defense Command General Surveillance Radar Stations

References

 Cornett, Lloyd H. and Johnson, Mildred W., A Handbook of Aerospace Defense Organization  1946 - 1980,  Office of History, Aerospace Defense Center, Peterson AFB, CO (1980).
 Winkler, David F. & Webster, Julie L., Searching the Skies, The Legacy of the United States Cold War Defense Radar Program,  US Army Construction Engineering Research Laboratories, Champaign, IL (1997).
 Information for Killeen AFS, TX

Radar stations of the United States Air Force
Aerospace Defense Command military installations
1957 establishments in Texas
1961 disestablishments in Texas
Installations of the United States Air Force in Texas
Military installations established in 1957
Military installations closed in 1961